SS Friendship was an Australian cargo ship which ran aground and sank at Tweed Heads, New South Wales, Australia, at the end of South Wall during a voyage from the Tweed River to Sydney, Australia.

Construction 
Friendship was constructed in 1897 at the Rock Davis shipyard, at Blackwall, on Brisbane Water. She had a compound engine driving a single screw propeller. She operated for Corrigan, B.M. & Co. from 1897 until her demise in 1912.

June 1912 grounding 
Friendship ran aground off Tweed Heads, New South Wales, on 2 June 1912. It was the first accident of her 15-year career. She was refloated a few days later and returned to service after repairs.

Sinking 
On 28 November 1912, Friendship left Tweed River bound for Sydney with a cargo of tallow. She had made this voyage numerous times with only one accident, the grounding the previous June. This time, however, she ran aground again at Tweed Heads at the end of South Wall. She sank, taking her cargo down with her, but there were no injuries or fatalities.

Wreck 
Friendship′s wreck lies at the entrance to the Tweed River on the coast of New South Wales.

References

1897 ships
Ships of Australia
Ships built in Australia
Shipwrecks of the Richmond-Tweed Region
Shipwrecks in the Coral Sea
Ships sunk with no fatalities
Maritime incidents in 1912